Emotional Rollercoaster is the unreleased second studio album by American R&B recording artist Keke Wyatt. The album was planned to be released on May 31, 2005, but after two postponed release dates, the release was cancelled altogether. One single, "Put Your Hands on Me", was released on May 31, 2005, and was highly successful on the US urban radio.

Songs slated to appear on her second album included the first single; Look at What You Made Me Do;, Insecurity, written by Bryan Michael Cox; My Man; Six Questions, featuring Avant; Cheaters; Who Knows, written by R&B singer Tank; Peace On Earth, a remake of a Rachelle Ferrell single; and the title track Emotional Rollercoaster featuring Ginuwine. In 2006, Wyatt was released from her contract with Cash Money Records, citing conflict with management as the reason for her departure. "Ghetto Rose" and "Who Knew?" were both released as singles, but not until she released 2007's Ghetto Rose and 2010's Who Knew?, respectively.

Recorded songs
List of recorded songs for the album between 2004-2005

Cheaters
Emotional Rollercoaster (feat. Ginuwine)
Getting It
Ghetto Rose
I'll Never Do it Again
Insecurity
Inspiration
Look At What You Made Me Do
My Man
Peace On Earth
Put Your Hands on Me
Shining
Six Questions (feat. Avant)
This, That, and the Third
Without You
Whole Lotta Nerve
Who Knew?
Who Knows
Won't Do It Again
Your Precious Love (feat. Avant)

References

Keke Wyatt albums
2005 albums
Unreleased albums